Durbar Marg or Durbarmarg (informally known as King's way) is a broad, long avenue in the Nepali capital, Kathmandu. It can be considered the heart of the city, akin to the Champs Elysées and the chief avenues of many capitals. As it leads to the Royal Palace of Narayanhiti, it is also known the King's Way among foreigners, Durbar meaning, as in the Moghul Empire, a royal gathering or court. It is a major tourist draw, vying with Thamel. It is flanked by luxury hotels (e.g. Hotel Del' Annapurna), restaurants serving international cuisine, global shopping brand outlets in refined centres including expensive boutiques, travel agencies, a couple of embassies and commercial banking headquarters and premium real estate such as international airline offices.

Location/History
A statue of King Mahendra, father of King Birendra stands in the center of the roundabout at the junction of Durbar Marg with Jamal maintained by Hotel Del' Annapurna. The ancient settlement of Jamal was a victim of the Ranas' enthusiasm for building. The rulers seized land from farmers and monasteries, demolishing an old bahal to make way for the new road. The bahal, one time abode of the 'White (Sveta) Matsyendranath', stood where a god image had been found in a field, an event commemorated every year at the Jana Baha Dyah Jatra. Sveta Matsyendranath chariot is assembled and driven three times round the spot over which the statue of King Mahendra now presides. Also on Durbar Marg, the greater part of which was built during the Rana era, are the campus of Tri-Chandra College and a mosque used by the valley's Muslim minority.

Recently, the Royal Palace was turned into a public museum immediately after the country was declared a republic and the surge in the construction activities in the region. Durbar Marg is a central junction for the road connecting Lazimpat and Thamel, Bhat-Bhateni and Baluwatar, New Road and Asan and Putali Sadak and Kamaladi. Durbar Marg is one of the best maintained and cleanest places in the Kathmandu valley, and a green belt has been created in the side way. Narayanhiti Palace Museum, luxury hotels, shopping malls, discos, pubs and famous branded showroom's have been a special feature of Durbar Marg.

Restaurants

 Hard Rock Cafe
 Nanglo Bakery Cafe and HotBread
 Italian Pizza and Ice Cream
 Wimpys Kings Burger Pvt. Ltd.
 KFC
 Pizza Hut
 Trisara

Banks and offices
 Kumari Bank Limited
 Nepal Investment Bank
 State Bank of India - Nepal (SBI)
 Nabil Bank
 Thai Airways
 Qatar Airways
 Baleno
 Mega Bank Nepal Limited
 Manakamana Network Communication

Shopping centers and shopping stores
 Sherpa Mall
 Square Mall
 Woodland Complex
 Adidas, Reebok, Puma, Nike, US Polo Assn, Arrow .
 Eighteen shop, Big Apple, Bentley.
 Brand stores: Zara, Benetton, Levi's, Swarovski, Cartier, etc.
 EvoStore: Apple, Bose, JBL, Incase, Speck

Art galleries and furniture
 Curio Concern
 The Curio Gallery
 Melange Home Incentives
 Antique House of Khanal & Sons
 Archies Gallery, Durbarmarg

Clubs and bars
 Club Platinum
 Club Ozone

Streets in Kathmandu